Atwater is a city on State Route 99 in Merced County, California, United States. The population as of the 2020 census was 31,970, up from 28,168 in 2010.

Geography
Atwater is in northern Merced County, between Merced, the county seat, to the southeast and Livingston to the northwest.

The city includes Castle Air Museum, but does not include the former Castle Air Force Base proper, now repurposed as Castle Airport.

History
The railroad reached Atwater in the 1870s, and a town grew around it. The first post office opened in 1880. Atwater incorporated in 1922. The name honors Marshall D. Atwater, a wheat farmer whose land was used by the railroad for its station.

North of the town is the site of Castle Air Force Base, the former World War II Merced Army Airfield. Castle was selected for closure under the 1991 Base Realignment and Closure Commission and the base closed September 30, 1995. The site is now a public airport.

On May 15, 2020, Atwater declared itself a business "sanctuary city" during the coronavirus pandemic.

Demographics

2010
At the 2010 census Atwater had a population of 28,168. The racial makeup of Atwater was 18,410 (65.4%) White, 14,808 (52.6%) Hispanic or Latino of any race, 1,225 (4.3%) African American, 364 (1.3%) Native American, 1,416 (5.0%) Asian, 76 (0.3%) Pacific Islander, 5,300 (18.8%) from other races, and 1,377 (4.9%) from two or more races.

The census reported that 28,066 people (99.6% of the population) lived in households, 31 (0.1%) lived in non-institutionalized group quarters, and 71 (0.3%) were institutionalized.

There were 8,838 households, 4,255 (48.1%) had children under the age of 18 living in them, 4,593 (52.0%) were opposite-sex married couples living together, 1,558 (17.6%) had a female householder with no husband present, 672 (7.6%) had a male householder with no wife present.  There were 615 (7.0%) unmarried opposite-sex partnerships, and 60 (0.7%) same-sex married couples or partnerships. 1,615 households (18.3%) were one person and 738 (8.4%) had someone living alone who was 65 or older. The average household size was 3.18.  There were 6,823 families (77.2% of households); the average family size was 3.61.

The age distribution was 9,016 people (32.0%) under the age of 18, 2,968 people (10.5%) aged 18 to 24, 7,492 people (26.6%) aged 25 to 44, 5,760 people (20.4%) aged 45 to 64, and 2,932 people (10.4%) who were 65 or older.  The median age was 30.0 years. For every 100 females, there were 95.7 males.  For every 100 females age 18 and over, there were 90.5 males.

There were 9,771 housing units at an average density of 1,602.9 per square mile, of the occupied units 4,905 (55.5%) were owner-occupied and 3,933 (44.5%) were rented. The homeowner vacancy rate was 3.3%; the rental vacancy rate was 10.9%.  14,920 people (53.0% of the population) lived in owner-occupied housing units and 13,146 people (46.7%) lived in rental housing units.

2000
At the 2000 census there were 23,113 people in 7,247 households, including 5,667 families, in the city. The racial makeup of the city was 57.34% White, 4.99% Black or African American, 1.27% Native American, 5.43% Asian, 0.36% Pacific Islander, 24.48% from other races, and 6.14% from two or more races.  41.51% of the population were Hispanic or Latino of any race.
Of the 7,247 households 45.9% had children under the age of 18 living with them, 55.9% were married couples living together, 16.3% had a female householder with no husband present, and 21.8% were non-families. 17.6% of households were one person and 6.9% were one person aged 65 or older.  The average household size was 3.15 and the average family size was 3.55.

The age distribution was 34.9% under the age of 18, 10.0% from 18 to 24, 28.6% from 25 to 44, 17.4% from 45 to 64, and 9.1% 65 or older.  The median age was 28 years. For every 100 females, there were 94.6 males.  For every 100 females age 18 and over, there were 90.4 males.

The median income for a household in Atwater is $37,344, and the median family income  was $39,789. Males had a median income of $32,983 versus $22,450 for females. The per capita income for the city was $15,162.  About 15.3% of families and 18.7% of the population were below the poverty line, including 25.1% of those under age 18 and 5.3% of those age 65 or over.

Government

Education

Primary and secondary schools

Public schools
Most of the city is zoned to the Atwater Elementary School District. Schools of AESD within Atwater and serving Atwater include:

 K-6
 Aileen Colburn Elementary School
 Shaffer Elementary School
 Thomas Olaeta Elementary School
 Elmer Wood Elementary School
 Mitchell K-6 Elementary School
 Peggy Heller Elementary School
 Bellevue Elementary School
 7-8
 Mitchell Senior Elementary School
 Bellevue Senior Elementary School
 Peggy Heller Junior High School
 High School
 Atwater High School
 Buhach Colony High School
 Other
 Atwater Valley Community Day School
 Atwater Senior Academy

A small section of eastern Atwater is located in the Merced City School District; that section is zoned to Rudolph Rivera Middle School. Franklin Elementary School is the closest elementary school to the section of Atwater.

Merced Union High School District operates Atwater High School and Buhach Colony High School, both of which serve and reside in Atwater.

Private schools

Newspapers
Atwater currently does not have a daily newspaper, although many of its residents use the daily paper, the Merced Sun-Star, which is published in nearby Merced. Additionally Atwater residents rely on local Facebook pages such as "Merced County news".
Atwater has two weekly newspapers called  The Atwater Signal  and The Atwater Times. The Atwater Signal  was first published in 1911. The Atwater Times is published by Mid Valley Publications, once a week.

Notable residents 

Bernard Berrian, NFL Chicago Bears, Minnesota Vikings wide receiver
Chuck Compton, NFL Green Bay Packers defensive back
Thomas W. Hayes, former California State Treasurer
Carrie Henn, actress, Rebecca "Newt" Jorden in Aliens (1986)
Jamill Kelly, 2004 Olympics silver medal in wrestling
Sheryl Underwood, actress
Willow Wisp, experimental Gothic/metal band

Sports 
 Atwater Aviators, of the Golden State Collegiate Baseball League
 Atwater Falcons - football and baseball
 Buhach Colony Thunder - football and basketball

See also 
 List of cities and towns in California

References 

Compass Maps: Merced, Atwater, Merced County
City of Atwater -- Approved Annexations

External links
 

Incorporated cities and towns in California
Cities in Merced County, California
1922 establishments in California
Populated places established in 1922